Dolní Třebonín is a municipality and village in Český Krumlov District in the South Bohemian Region of the Czech Republic. It has about 1,400 inhabitants.

Administrative parts
Villages of Čertyně, Dolní Svince, Horní Svince, Horní Třebonín, Prostřední Svince, Štěkře and Záluží are administrative parts of Dolní Třebonín.

References

Villages in Český Krumlov District